Radiotopia is a podcast network founded by 99% Invisible host Roman Mars and run by the Public Radio Exchange.  The network is organized as a collective of some two dozen shows whose producers have complete artistic control over their work. Podcasts in the network are downloaded more than 19 million times per month.

History
Radiotopia, founded by Roman Mars, was launched in February 2014 with an initial group of seven shows: Jonathan Mitchell's The Truth, Lea Thau's Strangers, Benjamin Walker's Theory of Everything, Nick van der Kolk's Love and Radio, the Kitchen Sisters' Fugitive Waves (later renamed The Kitchen Sisters Present...), Radio Diaries and Roman Mars' own flagship show 99% Invisible. The makers of these shows had decided to band together as independent producers who didn't all have the support of traditional radio broadcasting, targeting instead a growing audience of podcast listeners seeking recommendations for new things to listen to.

Initially supported by US$200,000 from the John S. and James L. Knight Foundation, the network is run by the Public Radio Exchange (PRX) who described it as "somewhat like an independent record label". In October 2014 a Kickstarter was started to support the growth of the network, raising over US$600,000 and making it the most-funded radio or podcast project on the site. This money went partly towards including four new shows. In May 2015 the network received a further US$1 million from the Knight Foundation to add more shows to the network and hired Julie Shapiro on as Radiotopia's executive producer in September of that year.

Around the time of Radiotopia's launch the network's podcasts received around 900,000 downloads per month. This figure had increased to 7.5 million by May 2015, 8.5 million in September 2015, 13 million as of June 2016, and more than 19 million times by the end of 2019. Within its first year, Radiotopia grew from seven to eleven shows, adding The Heart (formerly Audio Smut), Phoebe Judge's Criminal podcast,  Helen Zaltzman's The Allusionist, and The Mortified Podcast based on the popular international stage show and documentary series. Within the company's second year, Radiotopia adopted Hrishikesh Hirway's Song Exploder and Nate DeMeo's The Memory Palace from the Maximum Fun network, as well as Megan Tan's show Millennial and has continued to add new shows to its roster ever since.

Podcasts

Timeline of shows

Current shows
Radiotopia consists of the following podcasts:

Adult ISH 

Adult ISH features interviews, storytelling and advice by and for people in their 20s. Hosts Nyge Turner and Merk Nguyen highlight topics central to their own lives, such as mental health, professional goals, personal identity, music and relationships. The show debuted in 2018 through YR Media and partnered with Radiotopia for its second season.

Articles of Interest

Originally a miniseries appearing on 99% Invisible's podcast feed, Avery Trufelman's podcast about clothing, fashion and power was given its own feed in December 2018 and publicly announced in March 2019. Its debut season put Articles of Interest on many best-podcast-of-the-year lists, including that of the BBC, The Vulture, and The New Yorker Its third season focuses on American ivy, and was highlighted in The New York Times best-of-year list.

Ear Hustle

Ear Hustle is a podcast about life inside prison, produced by two inmates at San Quentin State Prison, Earlonne Woods and Antwan Williams, together with Nigel Poor, a Bay Area artist who volunteers at San Quentin. The show beat out 1,536 other entries to win Podquest – a 2016 contest organized by Radiotopia for new podcast ideas. The term "Ear Hustle" is prison slang for eavesdropping or being nosy. On November 21, 2018, Earlonne Woods' sentence was commuted, with Ear Hustle cited as a significant contributor to his reformation.

Everything is Alive
Everything is Alive is an unscripted interview show in which the host, Ian Chillag, interviews an actor inhabiting the role of a different inanimate object each episode. Interview "subjects" in the first season have included a can of generic cola, a bar of soap, and a mousetrap. These interviews are punctuated by conversations between Chillag and a real person, that further explores certain topics touched upon in the main interview. Before joining Radiotopia, Chillag was a producer on NPR's Wait Wait.... Don't Tell Me! and Fresh Air, and had previously co-hosted the now-defunct podcast How to Do Everything.

The Heart

The Heart originally aired in Canada under the name Audio Smut. It changed its name when moving to Radiotopia in 2015. On December 8, 2017 it was announced that The Heart would not be producing new shows in 2018. After December 2017, the show took a hiatus while its producers went on to make a serialized fiction podcast called The Shadows for the CBC in 2018. In 2019 producer Kaitlin Prest announced the founding of a new audio arts production company, Mermaid Palace, that will be making shows in partnership with Radiotopia and the CBC, including a new season of The Heart launching in January 2020.

The Kitchen Sisters Present

The Kitchen Sisters Present is a podcast produced by Davia Nelson and Nikki Silva, who are collectively known as the Kitchen Sisters. They have had long careers in radio production, with shows like Hidden Kitchens, Lost & Found Sound, and The Hidden World of Girls. Their podcast, then called Fugitive Waves, was one of the founding members of Radiotopia. In it they present pieces from their archive of stories built up over their careers, which they describe as "Stories from the flip side of history".

The Memory Palace

The Memory Palace is a monthly historical podcast hosted by Nate DiMeo. The Memory Palace moved to Radiotopia from the Maximum Fun network in 2016.

Mortified
Mortified is a podcast based on the popular stage show of the same name. Both the podcast and the original show feature adults sharing things they wrote as teenagers, such as diaries, letters, and poems, that now seem embarrassing in retrospect. The show was started in Los Angeles by David Nedelberg in 2005, from where it spread to other cities.  Nedelberg also turned the show into a book Mortified: Real Words. Real People. Real Pathetic. Together with Neil Katcher, he also created a documentary series, The Mortified Sessions, that ran on Sundance Channel for two seasons in 2011 and 2012, and a 2013 documentary movie, Mortified Nation. The podcast, which was also created by Nedelberg and Katcher joined Radiotopia in 2015. Celebrity guests who have appeared on the Mortified podcast include Elijah Wood, Kate Micucci, Chvrches, Alison Brie, Alanis Morissette, and Busy Philipps.

Oprahdemics: The Study of the Queen of Talk 

Each week, historians Kellie Carter Jackson and Leah Wright Rigueur dive deep into the cultural significance and contributions of…the Oprah Winfrey Show. These two long time friends talk about why Oprah matters to culture. They discuss diets, the LA Riots, Tyler Parry, Toni Morrison, The Oprah Book Club and more.

Passenger List 

A plane has disappeared mid-flight between London and New York with 256 passengers on board in a serialized fiction podcast starring Kelly Marie Tran. Tran plays Kaitlin Le, a college student on a quest to discover the truth behind the missing aircraft. The first eight-episode season ran in the fall of 2019. The second season will launch May 10, 2021.

Radio Diaries

Radio Diaries Inc. is a production company started by Joe Richman in 1996. Richman and his staff give everyday people a tape recorder and asks them to record their daily lives, and they then edit the raw tape to create an episode-length story. Richman's pieces have appeared on NPR's All Things Considered, and This American Life, and on BBC Radio. In 2013, Richman started the Radio Diaries podcast, as a showcase for his pieces. The podcast later became one of the founding members of Radiotopia.

Radiotopia Plus

In 2018 Radiotopia created a short-form exclusive podcast for its financial supporters. Each episode of Radiotopia Plus poses a question that the each of the network's show hosts and producers answer.

Radiotopia Presents

In 2017 Radiotopia launched a podcast feed under the name Showcase after putting out an open call for new podcast proposals. Out of over 1,500 entries four were chosen to run as limited series with weekly episodes all sharing Athena same podcast feed. After a successful run, four more limited series were chosen in 2018. In 2020 the feed was renamed Radiotopia Presents.

The series broadcast so far have been:
 Summer 2017: Damon Krukowski's six-episode treatise Ways of Hearing about how humans listen to music.
 Fall 2017: The Polybius Conspiracy, a podcast about urban legends.
 Winter 2018: Secrets by Swedish producers Mohamed El Abed, Martin Johnson and Åsa Secher, about the secrets people keep.
 Spring 2018: Errthang, by Al Letson and Willie Evans Jr. This is the second season of the podcast – the first season ran as an independent show.
 Summer 2018: The Great God of Depression by Karen Brown and Pagan Kennedy, a five-episode documentary about the author William Styron and his neurologist Alice Flaherty.
 Fall 2018: The Stoop, by Leila Day and Hana Baba, a four-episode series about stories regarding African Americans.
 Winter 2019: Spacebridge, by Julia Barton and Charles Maynes, a four-episode documentary about U.S.–Soviet Space Bridge.

Song Exploder

Song Exploder is a biweekly music podcast hosted and produced by Hrishikesh Hirway. The show features musicians talking about the creative process behind an individual song while "deconstructing" the song into its component parts. The podcast launched on the Maximum Fun network, went independent in February 2015 and joined Radiotopia in June 2015.

Theory of Everything

Producer Benjamen Walker ended his WFMU radio show Too Much Information (TMI) to start Theory of Everything as a founding member of Radiotopia. Theory focuses on stories as they relate to new technologies and shifts in culture, and Walker has used the podcast format to excerpt and serialize old episodes of TMI.

The Truth

The Truth is a biweekly fiction podcast that seeks to re-imagine what audio drama is and can be. Stories are developed as a collective where frequently the dialogue is completely improvised. Additionally, recordings are made on location and then taken into the studio to be edited. Work by The Truth has been heard on many nationally syndicated public radio programs, including This American Life, Studio 360, Snap Judgment, and The Story (see Links below).

ZigZag
ZigZag is the first production by Stable Genius Productions, a startup formed by Manoush Zomorodi, the former host of WNYC's podcast Note to Self, and her colleague Jen Poyant. The show itself is a documentary of the early days of the new company.

Former shows

99% Invisible 

99% Invisible is an independently produced radio show created by Roman Mars that focuses on design and architecture. It began as a collaborative project between San Francisco public radio station KALW and the American Institute of Architects in San Francisco. In April 2021 the company that produces the show (99% Invisible Inc.) was acquired by SiriusXM, with 99% Invisible moving to the Stitcher Radio network.

Appearances 
Appearances is a semi autobiographical podcast by Sharon Mashihi, an audio artist, screenwriter, and story editor, that had a limited run on Radiotopia.

Criminal

Criminal is an independently-produced podcast that focuses on true crime. The show describes itself as telling "stories of people who've done wrong, been wronged, or gotten caught somewhere in the middle". In 2021, Criminal host, Phoebe Judge, announced the show would leave the Radiotopia network to Vox Media. Judge expressed the change to be due to wishing to grow Criminal and spend more time on storytelling over business running. The founders expressed gratitude towards Radiotopia in a PRX newsletter. Criminal left alongside This is Love and Phoebe Reads a Mystery.

Love + Radio

Love and Radio is an American audio podcast directed by Nick van der Kolk and produced by Brendan Baker. It originally began in 2005 as a series of self-distributed episodes, though the show later received some support and distribution from NPR and Chicago Public Media. In 2014, the show joined Radiotopia as one of its 7 original members and began producing episodes on a more regular monthly schedule. In 2019, during the mid-season break after completing its 7th season, Love and Radio announced that they would be leaving the ad-supported Radiotopia network to join the subscription-supported podcasting service Luminary, starting with their 8th season in May 2019.

Millennial

Millennial was a semi-autobiographical podcast created by Megan Tan in 2015, when she graduated from college and was unemployed living with her boyfriend in Portland, Maine. It became part of the Radiotopia network in 2016. The podcast focused on the transition between university and work from the point of view of a person in their twenties. In 2017, Tan decided to end the podcast, and the final episode aired on August 16, 2017, making it the first show on the Radiotopia network to end its run. Tan went on to work as a producer of The Habitat from Gimlet Media.

Strangers

Strangers is hosted by Danish-born producer Lea Thau. Initially part of KCRW's Independent Producer project, Strangers became a founding member of Radiotopia in 2014. In 2017, Thau decided to leave the network and to continue producing the show independently. The show's last episode on the Radiotopia network aired on December 12, 2017, followed by an unofficial hiatus and a 2019 Patreon-backed revival.

The Allusionist 
The Allusionist is a podcast about the English language. Zaltzman was already the co-host of the Answer Me This! podcast and was looking at the possibility of starting a new podcast focused primarily on English etymology, which was a subject she was very interested in. Roman Mars helped Zaltzman find funding for this podcast, which eventually became The Allusionist, debuting on the Radiotopia network. Caroline Crampton of New Statesman put it on her list of podcasts of 2016. Zaltzman and the podcast left the Radiotopia network in October 2020 to make more resources to address the mostly white line-up at the network.

The Bugle

The Bugle is a satirical news podcast, created by John Oliver and Andy Zaltzman in 2007. It was initially  produced independently and distributed by TimesOnline until joining the Radiotopia network in September 2016. Focusing on global news stories (but primarily on UK/US news items), the show was launched in 2007 following John Oliver's move to New York to work on The Daily Show, allowing Oliver and Andy Zaltzman to continue a partnership that had previously enjoyed success with Political Animal and The Department. The show joined Radiotopia in 2016 after Oliver's departure. In late 2018 Andy Zaltzman announced that The Bugle was moving on from Radiotopia at the start of 2019.

The West Wing Weekly

The West Wing Weekly was an American podcast hosted by Hrishikesh Hirway and Joshua Malina, in which the hosts discussed one episode of the popular television program The West Wing, which originally aired on NBC from 1999 to 2006. The podcast has featured various cast and crew members including series creator Aaron Sorkin, director Tommy Schlamme, Rob Lowe, Bradley Whitford, Richard Schiff, Janel Moloney, Marlee Matlin, and Dulé Hill, as well as former government officials, academics, and pundits among others. The podcast finished its run with their discussion of the final episode of the series on 29 January 2020.

This Is Love

This Is Love was launched in 2018 by Phoebe Judge, Lauren Spohrer and Nadia Wilson — the team behind Criminal, another Radiotopia show. The show ran for a short six-episode season in early 2018, with a second season airing at the end of the same year. As of 2022, it has five seasons. The show tells stories on the subject of love. This is Love left the Radiotopia network in 2021 with Criminal and Phoebe Reads a Mystery.

Trump Con Law
Shortly after the inauguration of Donald Trump as the President of the United States, UC Davis School of Law Professor Elizabeth Joh joked that the President's erratic tweeting meant that she had to check Twitter five minutes before every class on Constitutional Law. Roman Mars contacted Professor Joh and they developed a podcast, taking advantage of the moment to teach constitutional law to laypersons. The show's full title, What Trump Can Teach Us About Constitutional Law is abbreviated as Trump Con Law by the show's hosts and distributors, as well in the press and scholarly citations.

Judas and the Black Messiah Podcast 
Judas and the Black Messiah Podcast is hosted by Fred Hampton Jr. and Elvis Mitchell and accompanies the film of the same name. The show was produced by Proximity and 99% Invisible and in partnership with Warner Bros. The podcast had a limited run and the last episode aired March 12, 2021.

Accolades and awards

In 2015 Fast Company ranked Radiotopia among the top 10 most innovative Kickstarter companies, and in 2017 as a top 10 innovator in media. Of 2016's 50 best podcasts as ranked by The Atlantic, eight were part of Radiotopia, and a similar list from The Guardian included five Radiotopia shows. In January 2019, VertitechIT listed ZigZag as one of the Top IT Podcasts of 2019. The network won "Podcast Network of the Year" at the 2019 Adweek Podcast Awards.

References

External links
 

 
2014 establishments in California
Podcasting companies